The Balkan International Basketball League (BIBL), also known as the Balkan League, is a multinational professional basketball league that features mostly clubs from the Balkans. The league included teams from countries as Bulgaria, North Macedonia, Montenegro, Kosovo, Albania and Israel. The most recent league champion is Hapoel Galil Elyon from Israel.

Purpose
The purpose of the Balkan International Basketball League is to provide competitive international play for clubs in the Balkans that would otherwise be unable to participate in international basketball. The league achieves this by providing financial support to all participating clubs in order to ease the costs that make international play difficult. Among other milestones, the league is also the first international league of its kind to include teams from Kosovo.

Format
As of the 2017-2018 season, the Balkan International Basketball League has introduced a new, simplified competition format. As per the new format, the competition will involve 8 teams playing each other in a double round robin (home and away) for a total of around 14 games. The changes to the league format include a new playoff format. The first and second place teams automatically qualify for playoffs, while teams placed 3rd to 6th will play each other home and away to make it to the final four (3 vs. 6, 4 vs. 5). Winning teams will advance to the finals to play for the championship.

At the start of the 2020-2021 season, 12 teams from Israel joined the league in order to participate in competitive league play during the COVID-19 era.

Championships

Titles by club

Titles by country

Current clubs (2021–22 season)

References

External links 
 BIBL Official Website
 Eurobasket.com League Page
 BallinEurope.com Article

 
Multi-national basketball leagues in Europe
2008 establishments in Europe
Sports leagues established in 2008
Basketball
Multi-national professional sports leagues